The Alpena County George N. Fletcher Public Library is a public library in Alpena, Michigan, United States.

History 
Located in downtown Alpena, the Alpena County George N. Fletcher Public
Library was established in 1967 as a county library. Prior to 1967, the public
library was part of the Alpena Public School system and was housed in the
high school. For the next seven years it occupied two storefronts on North
Second Avenue.

In 1974, the library moved into the present facility at 211 North First Avenue.
The  building was built with monies raised from county,
township, and Federal Revenue Sharing Funds plus a $100,000 grant from the
Jesse Besser Fund.

In 1985 a library millage was passed by the voters, and a renewal was successful
in 1995. An energy retrofit was done in 1986, and in 1997 the building received
a complete makeover, which included an electrical upgrade. A new computer lab,
with a direct connection to the Internet, was part of that project.

References

External links
 Homepage of Alpena Library.

Library buildings completed in 1974
Education in Alpena County, Michigan
Public libraries in Michigan
Buildings and structures in Alpena County, Michigan
Libraries established in 1967